Wolverine: The Best There Is was a monthly comic book series published by Marvel Comics from 2010 to 2012, and starring the superhero Wolverine. The series was written by Charlie Huston, and premiered with a first issue cover dated February 2011. It ended with issue #12, cover dated February 2012.

Publication history
While The Best There Is is not published under Marvel's MAX imprint, writer Charlie Huston has stated his intent to differ this title from the more mainstream Marvel series in which Wolverine is regularly featured.

Plot summary
In the "Contagion" storyline, which ran in issues 1-6, Wolverine faces Contagion, an opponent who becomes a much bigger problem if he is killed.

Reception
Wolverine: The Best There Is #1 received a rating of 1.5 out of 10 from IGN, a score described as "Unbearable" with reviewer Dan Iverson saying it had not a single redeeming quality. He blames writer Charlie Huston for 99% of what is wrong with the book, with only 1% of the blame going to artist Juan Jose Ryp for his artwork. Chris Murphy of Comics Alliance is strongly critical, calling it an "unfortunate compromise" stuck between an adult story, and trying to sell to a general audience. He also complains that Wolverine is an overexposed character. In keeping with the censored swearing used in the comic, he describes it as "####".

Comic Book Resources gives it a rating of 3.0 out of 5. Reviewer Chad Nevett calls it a slightly above average beginning with a strong cliffhanger, but notes the need to settle on a tone.

Collected editions

References

External links